This is the discography of Swiss singer Patrick Juvet.

Albums

Studio albums

Live albums

Soundtrack albums

Compilation albums

Video albums

Singles

References

Discographies of Swiss artists
Pop music discographies
Disco discographies